The Karaneeswarar Temple is a 12th-century Hindu temple in the neighbourhood of Mylapore in Chennai, India. The temple is dedicated to Shiva. The main deity is a shivalinga. There are also shrines to Sarvamangala Vinayaka, Dandapani, Durga, Lakshmi and Saraswathi.

History and legend

This temple is the abode of Lord Sri Karaneeswara and Mother Porkodi Amman. The temple is located at Bazaar road in the middle stretch of the popular Kutcheri road in Mylapore. It is about half a kilometer from the famous Kapaleeswarar temple. From Sanskrit language, Karana means "cause". Karana + Iswara (Lord) = Karaneeswara, "the Lord who is the cause". The general belief in the Hindu religion is that he is the primordial cause of this universe which is His very form. He is also the Lord who can teach us the causality behind all events.

Lord Karaneeswara is more than happy to grant material boons as well. The worship of Sri Karaneeswara and Mother Porkodi blesses one with a happy family life; there will be much amicability amongst all members of the family. Mix coconut oil, sesame oil (gingelly) and castor oil in equal parts and use this mixture to light oil lamps in multiples of six (6, 12, 18, 24 and so on) in this temple. Pradakshinam (circling the temple) is also very important here. The temple is worth visiting for its calm environment.

Another legend goes like this –

Karaneeswara temple is one of the Sapta Sthana Shiva temples in Mylapore (one of the seven sacred Shiva temples in Mylapore). They are:

 Karaneeswarar Temple
 Tirttapaleeswarar Temple
 Velleeswarar Temple
 Virupakshiswarar Temple
 Valeeswarar Temple
 Malleeswarar Temple
 Kapaleeshwarar Temple

In addition to these "Sapta Sthana Shiva sthalas", the Ekambareshwarar–Valluvar temple in the neighbourhood is traditionally considered the indispensable eighth.

As per the legend, there used to be a young Brahmin in Mylapore who used to perform poojas to Shiv Linga. Through his penance, the young Brahmin found out that Lord Shiva was the cause of creation, protection and destruction of this universe. Thereafter, the Shiv Linga (the main deity of this temple) was called as Karaneeswara. (Karaneeswara means one who has causes). Even though there is no solid proof, it is widely believed that this temple might belong to the 12th century CE.

The main deities of the temples are Karaneeswara (Shiva) and his consort Porkodi Amman. Both the deities are found in two separate shrines. The temple has a small tower and as per the tradition followed in all old South Indian temples, this temple also has bali peeth, flag staff and Nandi idol facing the main shrine. The entrance of the main shrine has the idols of Ganesha and Dhandayudhapani (Subramanya).

The following shrines are also found in this temple:
 Natraj with Sivakami
 Hanuman
 Bhairav
 Arunachaleswarar in the form of big Linga with Unnamulai
 Subramanya-Valli-Devasena
 Ganesha with his consorts Siddhi and Buddhi
 Saneeswarar
 Navagraha

The following idols are additionally found in this temple:
 Ganesha
 Nalvar – the four great devotees of Shiva
 Sekkilar
 Surya
 3–4 Shiv Lingas under the tree

Members of the Hindu religion believe that a visit to this highly sacred place will be enough to cure any ailment or disease.

See also

 Religion in Chennai
 Heritage structures in Chennai

References

Further reading 
 

Hindu temples in Chennai